The Virgin Islands competed at the 2015 Pan American Games held in Toronto, Canada from July 10 to 26, 2015.

Sailor Cy Thompson was the flagbearer for the team during the opening ceremony.

Competitors
The following table lists Virgin Island's delegation per sport and gender.

Athletics

The Virgin Islands qualified nine athletes (five male and four female). However, only five were permitted to compete (three men and two women) after the quota had to be reduced.

Men
Track & road events

Field events

Women
Track & road events

Boxing

The Virgin Islands qualified one male boxer.

Men

Fencing

The Virgin Islands qualified one male fencer.

Men

Golf

The Virgin Islands qualified one female golfer. 

Women

Sailing

The Virgin Islands qualified four sailors (three boats).

Shooting

The Virgin Islands received two wildcards.

Swimming

The Virgin Islands qualified two swimmers.

Taekwondo

The Virgin Islands qualified one male athlete, and also received a wildcard to enter a female athlete.

See also
Virgin Islands at the 2016 Summer Olympics

References

Nations at the 2015 Pan American Games
2015
2015 in United States Virgin Islands sports